The Bugmobile company was founded in July 1907 in Chicago, Illinois.

History
The Bugmobile Company was an American company founded in 1907. Production began late in 1907 for the 1908 model year. The cars had unique features such as an angle steel frame from which the entire engine and transmission was suspended. The transmission was selective with final drive. The company went out of business in 1909.

Models

Notes 

Motor vehicle manufacturers based in Illinois
Defunct motor vehicle manufacturers of the United States
Companies based in Chicago
Brass Era vehicles
Vehicle manufacturing companies established in 1907
1907 establishments in Illinois
Vehicle manufacturing companies disestablished in 1909
1909 disestablishments in Illinois